KCUB (1290 AM) is a commercial radio station located in Tucson, Arizona.  KCUB is owned by Cumulus Media and airs a sports radio format.  Its studios, offices and transmitter are co-located on Oracle Road in Tucson, north of downtown.

KCUB serves as the flagship radio station for University of Arizona Wildcats football and basketball games via IMG Sports. KCUB was the former Tucson-area affiliate of the NFL's Arizona Cardinals (Cardinals games are now heard on KTZR). Its studios and transmitter are co-located on Oracle Road in Tucson, north of downtown.

The format includes programming from CBS Sports Radio, including the syndicated Jim Rome Show, as well as local host Rich Herrera, who, in October 2020, began hosting the station's weekday afternoon show.

History
In August 1929, KCUB was founded as KVOA.  It was originally on 1260 kilocycles, with 500 watts, and owned by the Arizona Broadcasting Company.   KVOA was Tucson's second radio station, going on the air three years after KTUC.  KVOA was an affiliate of the NBC Red Network and carried its schedule of dramas, comedies, news, sports, soap operas, game shows and big band broadcasts during the Golden Age of Radio.  By the 1940s, power was boosted to 1,000 watts and the station moved to 1290 kHz.

In September 1953, the owners put KVOA-TV on the air, also an NBC affiliate.  Believing that TV would replace radio, the owners kept the TV station and sold off the radio station in 1958.  The new owner, Sherwood R. Gordon, renamed it KCUB but kept the affiliation with NBC.  In 1968, the station was sold to Rex Broadcasting, airing a country music format.

In 2001, KCUB was bought by Citadel Broadcasting, a forerunner of Cumulus, which switched it to its current sports format.

Previous logo

References

External links
 FCC History Cards for KCUB
 KCUB official website

CUB
Sports radio stations in the United States
Cumulus Media radio stations
Radio stations established in 1929
1929 establishments in Arizona
CBS Sports Radio stations